Hans Åge Yndestad (born July 24, 1980) is a Norwegian footballer. Yndestad is left footed and usually plays as either left back or as left winger.

Yndestad started his career with Ulfstind. He joined Tromsø in 2002 after having spent the 2001 season on loan with IF Skarp. It was former Skarp coach Trond Johansen who brought him to Alfheim.

In 2015, he joined Finnsnes IL.

Career statistics

References

External links
Yndestad profile at www.til.no 

1980 births
Living people
Sportspeople from Tromsø
Norwegian footballers
Tromsø IL players
Eliteserien players
Norwegian First Division players
Norwegian Second Division players
Norwegian Third Division players
Tromsdalen UIL players

Association football midfielders
FK Senja players